James Irsay (born June 13, 1959) is an American businessman, known for being the principal owner, chairman and CEO of the Indianapolis Colts of the National Football League (NFL).

Irsay's father, Robert Irsay, built a fortune estimated to be over $150 million through successful heating and air-conditioning companies.

Early life and education
Irsay was born in Lincolnwood, Illinois, the son of Harriet (née Pogorzelski) and Chicago businessman Robert Irsay. His father was from a Hungarian Jewish family and his mother was the daughter of Polish Catholic immigrants. Irsay was raised Catholic, and did not know about his father's Jewish heritage until he was fourteen. Jim's brother, Thomas Irsay, was born with a mental disability and died in 1999, and his sister, Roberta, died in a car accident in 1971. Irsay attended high school at Loyola Academy in Wilmette, Illinois a suburb just north of Chicago and at Mercersburg Academy '78, Mercersburg, Pennsylvania. After high school, he attended, and graduated from, Southern Methodist University in 1982 with a degree in broadcast journalism. Irsay played linebacker for the SMU Mustangs football team as a walk-on, but an ankle injury ended his playing career.

Career
Irsay was 12 years old when his father, Robert Irsay, acquired the Baltimore Colts, after initially purchasing the Los Angeles Rams, then swapping franchises with Colts owner Carroll Rosenbloom. After graduating from SMU in 1982, he joined the Colts' professional staff. He was named Vice President and General Manager in 1984, one month after the Colts relocated from Baltimore, to Indianapolis. After his father suffered a stroke in 1995, Jim assumed day-to-day management with the role of Senior Executive Vice President, General Manager and Chief Operating Officer in April 1996. When his father died in 1997 Jim engaged in a legal battle with his stepmother over ownership of the team, but later became the youngest NFL team owner at that time at 37.

Since Jim took over in 1995, the Colts have compiled a 258-191-1 regular season record. According to Pro Football Reference, the 258 wins are the fourth-most in the NFL over that time frame. The team has won 10 division titles, made the playoffs 18 times, appeared in two Super Bowls and won Super Bowl XLI. Indianapolis won 115 regular season games from 2000–09, which is the second-most in a decade by any NFL team.

Since joining the organization in 1984, Irsay has worked with numerous Pro Football Hall of Fame coaches, players and executives, including Eric Dickerson (Pro Football Hall of Fame class of 1999), Marshall Faulk (2011), Bill Polian (2015), Tony Dungy (2016), Marvin Harrison (2016), Edgerrin James (2020) and Peyton Manning (2021).

In 2009, Irsay was vocal about preventing a group that included talk-show host Rush Limbaugh from purchasing the St. Louis Rams. "I, myself, couldn't even consider voting for him," Irsay said at an NFL owners meeting. "When there are comments that have been made that are inappropriate, incendiary and insensitive... our words do damage, and it's something we don't need", referring to comments Limbaugh made about Donovan McNabb in 2003, when he was an NFL commentator for ESPN. Irsay has made political contributions to John Edwards and Harry Reid.

In October 2022 at a National Football League owner's meeting, Irsay said he believed "that there’s merit to remove Daniel Snyder as the owner of the Washington Commanders" amid calls for Snyder to sell the franchise.

Irsay came under scrutiny in November 2022 when he fired Colts head coach Frank Reich after a 3–5–1 start to the season and replaced him with former Colts player Jeff Saturday as interim head coach. Saturday previously had no coaching experience beyond the high school football level, and was employed as an NFL analyst for ESPN at the time of his hiring.

Philanthropy 
Irsay and his family have donated to various projects and programs across Indiana, including the Irsay Family YMCA, the downtown Indianapolis Colts Canal Playspace, Riley Hospital for Children, Wheeler Mission Center for Women & Children, Indiana University’s Irsay Research Institute and many others.

On November 20, 2022, Irsay donated $1 million to the Indianapolis Zoo. The zoo is currently undergoing a renovation and the gift will assist with the building of a new Indianapolis Colts Welcome Center Plaza. The project is set to be complete by Memorial Day 2023.

In late 2020, the Irsay family launched Kicking The Stigma, which is dedicated to "raise awareness about mental health disorders and to remove the shame and stigma too often associated with these illnesses." The foundation has numerous partner organizations, including Mental Health America of Indiana, National Alliance on Mental Illness of Greater Indianapolis, Project Healthy Minds and Bring Change to Mind. As of late 2022, Kicking The Stigma had committed more than $17 million (through action grants and personal donations by the Irsay family) towards its initiatives. In 2022, a total of $1.4 million in action grants were distributed to 23 nonprofits and organizations in the mental health sector. In 2021, the action grants totaled $2.7 million and were gifted to 16 groups.

In December 2021, the Irsay family donated $3 million to Indiana University to create a research institute dedicated to studying mental health and the stigma associated with it. The donation was an extension of Kicking The Stigma. Named the Irsay Family Research Institute, the center will be located on IU's Bloomington campus in Morrison Hall. Some of the focuses of the center will be providing support for research, analyzing sociomedical sciences, advancing more graduates trained in the mental health field and promoting mental health more locally and nationally.

Irsay has been a staunch supporter of former Colts Head Coach Chuck Pagano, who beat acute promyelocytic leukemia after being diagnosed in September 2012. Pagano, who served as head coach of the team from 2012–17, hosts his Chuckstrong Tailgate Gala every year in Indianapolis. Since 2012, the galas have raised more than $12 million for research at the Indiana University Melvin and Bren Simon Comprehensive Cancer Center, where Pagano received treatment. The gala has been hosted at the Colts' Indiana Farm Bureau Football Center as well as Jim Irsay's house. In 2021, Irsay hosted the gala at his house and donated $2 million to the IU cancer research after Pagano made a free throw for $1 million and 10 layups for $100,000 apiece on Irsay's basketball court.

Personal life
Irsay married Meg Coyle in 1980, and the couple have three daughters, Carlie Irsay-Gordon, Casey Foyt and Kalen Jackson, as well as 10 grandchildren. After being separated since 2003, Meg filed for divorce on November 21, 2013.

On March 16, 2014, Irsay was arrested under suspicion of DUI and drug possession in Carmel, Indiana. According to The Indianapolis Star sports columnist Bob Kravitz, Irsay had an ongoing drug problem. This was highlighted when it was later revealed that Irsay's mistress, Kimberly Wundrum, had overdosed and died in a house that Irsay controversially purchased with money belonging to the Indianapolis Colts.

Irsay's daughter, Carlie, took over the day-to-day operations of the Colts while he was in rehab. On September 2, 2014, shortly after pleading guilty to OWI and being sentenced to one year of probation, Irsay was suspended by the NFL for six games and fined $500,000.

Irsay appeared as himself in the episodes "Two Parties" and "Fluoride" of the sitcom Parks and Recreation.

According to the IndyStar, Irsay was an accomplished weightlifter and competed in super heavyweight championships in the 1980s, all while serving as the general manager of the Colts. He would lift weights with Colts players and could squat over 700 pounds. Following his weightlifting career, Irsay ran marathons and could finish 26.2 miles in three hours and 40 minutes.

The Jim Irsay Collection
Outside football, Irsay has made significant investments in music and memorabilia with The Jim Irsay Collection. In 2001 Irsay purchased the original manuscript of On the Road, or "the scroll": a continuous, one hundred twenty-foot scroll of tracing paper sheets that Jack Kerouac cut to size and taped together, for $2.43 million. On May 5, 2018, he  purchased an original printing of the 1939 book Alcoholics Anonymous with notes handwritten by the author Bill Wilson, cofounder of AA, for $2.4 million at auction.

In 2021, Guitar Magazine dubbed Irsay as owner of, "The greatest guitar collection on Earth."

Irsay has purchased guitars originally owned by Elvis Presley, George Harrison, John Lennon, Paul McCartney, Jerry Garcia ("Tiger"), Prince, Les Paul’s 1954 Black Beauty and other notable performers. His purchases have set records: in 2014 he bought the electric guitar that Bob Dylan played at Newport for just under US$1 million and in 2017 he paid US$2.2 million for a Ludwig drum set belonging to Ringo Starr.  On June 20, 2019, Irsay paid a record $3.975 million for a guitar, known as The Black Strat, formerly owned  by Pink Floyd guitarist David Gilmour. On May 23, 2022, Irsay paid a record $4.6 million for the 1969 Fender Mustang played by Nirvana's Kurt Cobain in the music video for "Smells Like Teen Spirit." On July 25, 2022 Irsay purchased Muhammad Ali's "Rumble In The Jungle" championship belt for $6.18 million after a 2 hour bidding war. In 2023, Irsay acquired the saddle used by Secretariat when he won the American Triple Crown in 1973.

The Jim Irsay Band 
Irsay has his own all-star band, The Jim Irsay Band, and has hosted free concerts across the country in Nashville, Tenn., Washington, D.C., Austin, Tex., Los Angeles, New York City, Chicago, Indianapolis, San Francisco and eventually Las Vegas. Among the artists that have performed with the band are singer-songwriter John Mellencamp, guitarist/singer Buddy Guy, singer-songwriter John Hiatt, guitarist Mike Wanchic, bassist Mike Mills, guitarist Tom Bukovac, guitarist Kenny Wayne Shepherd, drummer Kenny Aronoff, keyboardist Michael Ramos and Rock and Roll Hall of Fame singer Ann Wilson among others. Pieces from The Jim Irsay Collection travel with the band and are on display.

References

External links

1959 births
Living people
American billionaires
American people of Hungarian-Jewish descent
American people of Polish descent
Businesspeople from Illinois
Catholics from Illinois
Catholics from Indiana
Indianapolis Colts executives
Indianapolis Colts owners
National Football League general managers
People from Carmel, Indiana
People from Lincolnwood, Illinois
Southern Methodist University alumni
Jewish American sportspeople
21st-century American Jews